Vasilios Tzalakostas (born 20 July 1959) is a Greek retired football striker and later manager.

References

1959 births
Living people
Greek footballers
Ilisiakos F.C. players
Athinaikos F.C. players
Levadiakos F.C. players
Ethnikos Asteras F.C. players
Greek football managers
Athinaikos F.C. managers
Atromitos F.C. managers
Panegialios F.C. managers
Association football forwards